Paste is an album by punk rock band Alien Father. It is a compilation of previous work released only to friends, as well as some new material.

Track listing
"Alien Father"  – 1:28
"Gbacl Lravong"  – 2:53
"Your Life As A Kite"  – 1:35
"John Carnival"  – 1:55
"D"  – 1:35
"Jeffrey"  – 2:28
"Phobus"  – 2:52
"Lazerus"  – 1:15
"Monster Shark"  – 1:19
"Never Forget: Taylor Halsey"  – 0:59
"fgt lawbuster"  – 2:30
"Myopian Desert"  – 1:56
"Alan Cummings Twice"  – 1:18
"Wing Fortress"  – 2:06
"Orange You Glad?"  – 1:56
"A Tate Production"  – 1:33
"Bend The Robot"  – 1:00
"Candy Is Dandy (If Yr A Teen)"  – 1:04
"Octopus Vs. Paddle"  – 1:01
"Alex The Indian"  – 2:08
"The Hookter"  – 2:19
"Kewl Guy Licking A Popsicle"  – 2:17
"Summer Samurai"  – 1:04

Album personnel
Dave Hallinger – guitar, bass, vocals
Curtis Regian – synth, bass, guitar
Mike Topley – drums

References

External links 

2007 compilation albums
Alien Father albums